Edmund Lechmere may refer to:

 Edmund Lechmere (MP for Worcestershire) (1710–1805), MP for Worcestershire
 Edmund Lechmere (MP for Worcester) (1747–1798), MP for Worcester (son of the above)
 Sir Edmund Lechmere, 2nd Baronet (1792–1856)
 Sir Edmund Lechmere, 3rd Baronet (1826–1894), Conservative MP
 Sir Edmund Lechmere, 4th Baronet (1865–1937)